Achta Ahmat Bremé is the Minister of Territorial Planning, Urban Development, & Housing for the Republic of Chad. Bremé has also been the Minister of Vocational Training and Small Trades.

References

Chadian politicians
Year of birth missing (living people)
Living people